De Viron Castle is a castle in Dilbeek, Flemish Brabant, Belgium, which houses the offices of the local authority.

History
It was built in 1863 by the Jean-Pierre Cluysenaar, commissioned by the de Viron family, which settled in Dilbeek in 1775. The Tudor-style castle was built on the ruins of a 14th-century fortification which was destroyed in 1862. One of the medieval towers, the Sint-Alenatoren, can still be seen in the park surrounding the current building. It is named after Saint Alena, who lived in Dilbeek.

On his visit to this fort, Charles V was reportedly served rabbit instead of his favourite hare, which resulted in the nickname konijnenfretters (rabbit eaters) for the inhabitants of Dilbeek.

It became the town house of Dilbeek in  1923, and was protected as a monument in 1990.

Architectury
The castle counts 12 towers, 52 rooms, 365 windows and 7 staircases. This refers to the Julian Calendar which has 12 months, 52 weeks, 365 days and 7 days in a week. The castle lies in a parc, with several other buildings of interest : a farm, an ice cellar and a stagecoach building.

References

External links

 

Dilbeek
Viron
Viron